Alberto de Carvalho, nicknamed Ginguba (born 18 August 1956), is an Angolan-Portuguese coach. He is a former coach of the Angola national basketball team.

Before moving to Angola where he won two straight national championships with Petro Atlético in 2006 and 2007, he coached Lusitânia of Portugal.

In 2006, he was chosen to replace Mário Palma as the Angola coach for the 2006 FIBA World Championship finals. He won the 2007 FIBA Africa Championship and was his country coach for the 2008 Olympic Games tournament in Beijing.

In August 2016, Ginguba was appointed head-coach of Progresso do Sambizanga

See also 
 List of FIBA AfroBasket winning head coaches

References

1956 births
Living people
Portuguese basketball coaches
Angolan basketball coaches
Atlético Petróleos de Luanda (basketball) coaches